Kleitomachos (Greek: Κλειτόμαχος, variously also transliterated Cleitomachus or Clitomachus) may refer to:

 Kleitomachos (athlete), Theban athlete of the 3rd century BCE
 Clitomachus (philosopher), an Academic philosopher of the 2nd century BCE